Ural is the name of several rural localities in Russia:
Ural, Baymaksky District, Republic of Bashkortostan, a village in Zilairsky Selsoviet of Baymaksky District in the Republic of Bashkortostan
Ural, Buzdyaksky District, Republic of Bashkortostan, a village in Karansky Selsoviet of Buzdyaksky District in the Republic of Bashkortostan
Ural, Gafuriysky District, Republic of Bashkortostan, a village in Yangiskainsky Selsoviet of Gafuriysky District in the Republic of Bashkortostan
Ural, Karmaskalinsky District, Republic of Bashkortostan, a village in Karlamansky Selsoviet of Karmaskalinsky District in the Republic of Bashkortostan
Ural, Kushnarenkovsky District, Republic of Bashkortostan, a village in Rasmekeyevsky Selsoviet of Kushnarenkovsky District in the Republic of Bashkortostan
Ural, Uchalinsky District, Republic of Bashkortostan, a village in Imangulovsky Selsoviet of Uchalinsky District in the Republic of Bashkortostan
Ural, Yanaulsky District, Republic of Bashkortostan, a village in Yamadinsky Selsoviet of Yanaulsky District in the Republic of Bashkortostan
Ural, Chelyabinsk Oblast, a settlement in Uralsky Selsoviet of Kizilsky District in Chelyabinsk Oblast
Ural, Krasnoyarsk Krai, a settlement in Uralsky Selsoviet of Rybinsky District of Krasnoyarsk Krai
Ural, Kurgan Oblast, a village in Uralsky Selsoviet of Vargashinsky District in Kurgan Oblast; 
Ural, Orenburg Oblast, a settlement in Uralsky Selsoviet of Kuvandyksky District in Orenburg Oblast
Ural, Yutazinsky District, Republic of Tatarstan, a settlement in Yutazinsky District of the Republic of Tatarstan
Ural, Zainsky District, Republic of Tatarstan, a settlement in Zainsky District of the Republic of Tatarstan

See also
Uralsk, several rural localities in Russia
Uralsky (inhabited locality), several inhabited localities in Russia